Chondrodendron tomentosum is one of six accepted species  in the small genus Chondrodendron, belonging to the Moonseed family Menispermaceae. It is a large tropical liana native to Central and South America.It contains highly toxic alkaloids and is one of the sources of the arrow poison curare - specifically 'tube curare', the name of which is derived from the name of the medicinally valuable alkaloid tubocurarine.

Derivation of scientific name
The generic name is a compound of Greek χόνδρος ( chondros ) 'cartilage' / 'lump' / 'grain' and δένδρον ( dendron ) 'tree' - hence 'lumpy / gristly tree', while the specific name consists of the Latin adjectival form tomentosum 'covered in matted hairs'. The binomial in its entirety thus conveys the image of a rather large coarse plant.

Description
Chondrodendron tomentosum is a woody climbing plant with stems that can reach 10 cm in thickness at the base and which can climb up to 30 metres into the rainforest canopy. The large, glossy, cordate leaves are densely clothed beneath with a silky white pubescence, from which it gets its common name 'Velvet Leaf'.

References

Menispermaceae
Flora of Central America
Flora of South America
Plants described in 1798
Poisonous plants